Looking for a Man is a 1973 Soviet drama film directed by Mikhail Bogin.

Plot 
The film is based on true stories about separation and meetings, about the search for loved ones, which continued many years after the Second World War.

Cast 
 Oleg Zhakov as Ivan Grigorievich
 Rimma Manukovskaya as Valentina Dmitrievna Rudakova
 Eleonora Aleksandrova as Nina Lykova
 Lyudmila Antonyuk as 	Nina's mother	
 Gennadiy Yalovich as Nina's brother
 Liya Akhedzhakova	as Alla Kuznetsova
  Mikhail Asafov  as Velekhov
 Sergey Dreyden as architect
 Natalya Gundareva as  Klava
 Lyudmila Ivanova as switchman
 Valentin Nikulin as a visitor to the bath
 Raisa Ryazanova as  weaver

References

External links 
 

1973 films
1970s Russian-language films
Soviet drama films
Gorky Film Studio films
1973 drama films